FC Vitosha is a Bulgarian association football club based in Bistritsa, Sofia City Province, which competes in the Second League, the second tier of Bulgarian football. It is named after the Vitosha mountain range, where Bistritsa is located.

Vitosha was founded in 1958, however, the club spent the majority of its history playing in lower leagues. In 2017, Vitosha managed to promote to the First League for the first time ever. The club was relegated after the 2019-20 season and re-founded in 2021.

The club became notable for having Bulgaria's prime minister, Boyko Borisov, as a registered player of the squad in the lower divisions. The increased popularity of the club due to Borisov's presence led to its coach and players being featured on the TV series BNT Taxi in 2011.

History

1958–2007: Regional divisions
The club was founded in 1958 and played in the regional divisions until 2007 when it gained promotion to the third division. In the 1972–73 Bulgarian Cup they entered the preliminary round but eventually lost to Pirin Blagoevgrad with a 3-0 result.

2007–2016: Amateur division and B Group breakthrough
From 2007 to 2016 the team played regularly in the V Group. In May 2012, Vitosha claimed the Amateur League Cup for the first time in their history, eliminating Dve Mogili 2–1 in the final match. During the 2012-13 V Group, the club ranked second in the South-West V Group and achieved promotion to Bulgaria's professional B Group for the first time in their history.

During the 2013–14 Bulgarian Cup, Vitosha eliminated Bansko with an aggregate score of 3-1 to advance to the Round of 16 of the Bulgarian Cup for the first time ever. Previously, their highest achievement had been reaching the Round of 32 in the 1972 Bulgarian Cup.

2016–2020: From third tier to first tier, then dissolution
Vitosha finished the 2015–16 V Group in second place after CSKA Sofia, but due to the adoption of a new league structure for the Second League, they were promoted again. In the meantime, the club started investing in a youth academy consisting of five youth teams for the 2016–17 season and reconstruction works on the club's stadium. On May 3, 2017, Vitosha presented an update of their current club crest. A few days later, on May 8, 2017, they also signed a sponsorship agreement with Bulgarian gambling company Efbet for the upcoming two seasons.

On June 2, 2017, Vitosha won the play-off relegation match against Neftochimic Burgas and achieved promotion to the top division for first time in their history.

Despite their poor performance during the regular season, finishing last with the worst defense and attack, and gaining only one victory, Vitosha avoided relegation from the 2017–18 First League, winning the play-offs against Pirin Blagoevgrad and Lokomotiv Sofia. Vitosha improved their performance in the next season, avoiding relegation once more.

However, the 2019-20 season was disastrous for Vitosha. The team finished in the last place in the regular season, with only one win. Since the number of matches was reduced by half for the season, Vitosha was mathematically relegated even before the relegation phase started. This ended their three-year stay in the Bulgarian top tier.

On 28 September 2020, after several matches from the new season were completed, the first team was dissolved while keeping only the youth teams.

2021–present: Re-founding and amateur leagues
On 25 May 2021 the team announced that they would join the Third League playing the most with youth academy players and Nikolay Hristozov as manager. At the end of the 2021–22 season, Vitosha finished in second place in the Southwest Third League, but the team was promoted to the Second League after Tsarsko Selo, which was relegated from the First League, announced its dissolution, thus leaving an empty spot in the Second League. The Bulgarian Football Union gave Vitosha the place in the Second League, since they had accumulated the most points out of all second-placed teams from the regional third leagues.

During the 2022–23 season, while competing in the Second League, Vitosha also qualified for the Bulgarian Cup. Vitosha made a surprising performance by eliminating first tier side Botev Vratsa in the round of 32, after eliminating Chernolomets Popovo in the first round. Vitosha set up a meeting with another First League team, Lokomotiv Sofia in the round of 16.

Honours
Bulgarian First League:
 13th place (1): 2016–17, 2018–19

Cup of Bulgarian Amateur Football League
  Winners (2): 2012, 2022

Bulgarian Cup
 Round of 16 (2): 2013–14, 2018–19

Players

Current squad

Foreign players
Up to one non-EU national can be registered and given a squad number for the first team in the Second League. Those non-EU nationals with European ancestry can claim citizenship from the nation their ancestors came from. If a player does not have European ancestry he can claim Bulgarian citizenship after playing in Bulgaria for 5 years.

Goalscoring and appearance records

Personnel

Manager history

Current technical body

League Stats

Seasons
2017–18 FC Vitosha Bistritsa season

2018–19 FC Vitosha Bistritsa season

2019–20 FC Vitosha Bistritsa season

League positions

Past seasons

References

External links

bgclubs.eu

 
Vitosha Bistritsa
1958 establishments in Bulgaria